Voráček (feminine Voráčková) is a Czech surname. Notable people with the surname include:

 Jakub Voráček (born 1989), Czech ice hockey player
 Martin Voráček (born 1992), Czech footballer
 Tomáš Voráček (born 1990), Czech ice hockey player
 Veronika Voráčková, Czech basketball player

Czech-language surnames